Temple Emanu-El of New York is a synagogue at 1 East 65th Street on the Upper East Side of Manhattan in New York City, at the northeast corner with Fifth Avenue. It was built for Congregation Emanu-El of New York in 1928–1930. It is one of the largest synagogues in the world.

The first Temple Emanu-El 

This is the second synagogue with this name. Previously, there was a synagogue of the same name at 43rd Street and Fifth Avenue, built in 1868. This building was demolished in 1927 before the construction of the new, present synagogue.

History 
In 1929, the congregation moved to its present location at 65th Street and Fifth Avenue, where the Temple building was constructed to designs of Robert D. Kohn on the former site of the Mrs. William B. Astor House. The vast load-bearing masonry walls support the steel beams that carry its roof. The hall seats 2,500, larger than St Patrick's Cathedral.

The building was built between 1928 and 1929 or 1930. Its style is said by some to be Romanesque Revival — others say Moorish Revival with art deco ornamentation. The mosaics were made by the famous Hildreth Meière (1892–1961).
 
The building on Fifth Avenue is one of the largest synagogues in the world. In size, it rivals many of the largest European synagogues such as the Grand Choral Synagogue of St. Petersburg, Moscow Choral Synagogue, and the Budapest Great Synagogue. Emanu-El means "God is with us" in Hebrew.

In the building there is a museum with a collection that includes more than 650 pieces that date from the 14th century to the present day, which can be separated into two main categories: History of Emanu-El and Judaica. The museum also has special exhibitions, lectures and tours.

Gallery

References

External links

New York Landmarks Conservancy

Fifth Avenue
Upper East Side
1930 establishments in New York City
Reform synagogues in New York City
Religious buildings and structures completed in 1930